"Why?" is a protest song by American rapper Jadakiss, and the second single released from his second solo album Kiss of Death. It was produced by Havoc. It was a crossover hit in several countries. The song ranked #64 in About.com's Top 100 Rap Songs. The remix produced by Elite with a new chorus was later released featuring Anthony Hamilton, Styles P, Common and Nas. 

Although not a remix nor a sequel, Jadakiss released the song "What If" that almost follows the same concept as "Why". All of the verses start with the latter title. It included Nas (who - as mentioned above - was featured in the remix of "Why").

Controversy
Jadakiss attracted some controversy and condemnation from the political commentator Bill O'Reilly, who labeled him a "smear merchant" because of the lyrics in the song, which state Jadakiss' belief that the September 11 attacks were an inside job, or that then-President George W. Bush caused or allowed the attacks:

"Bush" is censored in clean versions of the song. The music video shows a man holding up a picket sign reading "BUCK FUSH" -  a spoonerism of "FUCK BUSH".

O'Reilly took the position that President Bush should be allowed to sue Jadakiss for slander. The track was eventually banned on some radio stations or played with the lyrics in question censored.

Music Video

In the music video, Jadakiss raps while appearing as a gangsta, a news anchor, and a homeless man, and also acting out some of the lyrics. In the third verse, Jada appears wearing a white t-shirt with the word 'why' on it, leading a protest. Several people also wear the same shirt. Anthony Hamilton also appears, first singing the chorus separately, then as part of the march at the end. In the crowd, a man is shown holding up the picket sign reading "BUCK FUSH."

Track listing
"Why" (album version)
"Why" Remix feat. Kool Savas
"Kiss of Death" (main version)
"The Champ Is Here" (explicit version)
"Why" (video)

Charts

Weekly charts

Year-end charts

Release history

References

2004 singles
Anthony Hamilton (musician) songs
Jadakiss songs
Music videos directed by Sanaa Hamri
Song recordings produced by Havoc (musician)
Songs written by Havoc (musician)
Songs written by Jadakiss
Ruff Ryders Entertainment singles
2004 songs
Political rap songs
Songs written by Anthony Hamilton (musician)
Music controversies